Gustavo Ariel Toledo (born 19 September 1989) is a retired Argentine professional footballer who played as a right-back.

Career
Toledo began his career with Primera División side Banfield, firstly in the youth teams before making his first-team debut in 2010 versus Racing Club de Avellaneda. In his first three seasons as a professional, Toledo made twenty-one appearances in the top-flight before the club were relegated to Primera B Nacional, this saw Toledo become a regular member as he played fifty-five league matches over two seasons as Banfield were promoted back into the Primera División at the second time of asking. Nineteen more league appearances came for Toledo in 2014 before, in 2015, he left Banfield to join fellow Primera División side Independiente.

On 15 February 2015, Toledo made his Independiente league debut in a 2–3 away win against Newell's Old Boys. On 19 July 2017, Toledo joined fellow Primera División team Colón on loan. His first match for Colón came on 24 September against Defensa y Justicia, they won 3–1. The 200th appearance of Toledo's career arrived on 7 May 2018 during a draw with River Plate. Colón completed the permanent signing of Toledo in July 2018.

In September 2021, Toledo announced his retirement from football.

Career statistics
.

Honours
Banfield
 Argentine Primera División: 2009–10 Apertura
 Primera B Nacional: 2013–14

References

External links

1989 births
Living people
Sportspeople from Buenos Aires Province
Argentine footballers
Association football defenders
Argentine Primera División players
Primera Nacional players
Club Atlético Banfield footballers
Club Atlético Independiente footballers
Club Atlético Colón footballers
Atlético Tucumán footballers